Aralia hispida, commonly known as the bristly sarsaparilla, is a member of the family Araliaceae. It can be found in eastern North America from Hudson Bay south to Indiana and from Minnesota east to Newfoundland. It prefers dry and sandy soil, and is a perennial that blooms in June and July. Fruits are dark and globose.

References

hispida